Trm1 may refer to:
 TRNA (guanine26-N2/guanine27-N2)-dimethyltransferase
 TRNA (guanine26-N2)-dimethyltransferase